The 2010 Judo Grand Slam Paris was held in Paris, France, from 6 to 7 February 2010.

Medal summary

Men's events

Women's events

Source Results

Medal table

References

External links
 

2010 IJF World Tour
2010 Judo Grand Slam
Judo
Grand Slam Paris 2010
Judo
Judo